Desiree Ross is an American actress. She is best known for starring as Sophia Greenleaf in the Oprah Winfrey Network drama series, Greenleaf, from 2016 to 2020. She also starred alongside Dolly Parton in the Lifetime television film, A Country Christmas Story in 2013.

Life and career
Ross was born and grew up in Columbia, South Carolina. She is the elder of two children in her family. She began acting in short films before she was cast as lead in the Lifetime television film A Country Christmas Story opposite Dolly Parton, Mary Kay Place and Megyn Price. The following year, Ross had a recurring role as Mira in the TNT post-apocalyptic drama series Falling Skies.

In 2015, Ross was cast in a series regular role in the Oprah Winfrey Network drama series, Greenleaf. She plays Sophia Greenleaf, the daughter of series lead' Grace 'Gigi' Greenleaf (played by Merle Dandridge). The series also stars Lynn Whitfield, Keith David, and Oprah Winfrey.

Filmography

References

External links 
 

1999 births
Living people
American television actresses
21st-century American actresses
Actresses from Columbia, South Carolina